Perborough Castle is the site of an Iron Age univallate hillfort located at Compton in Berkshire. Archaeological evidence, from excavations in 1838, suggest that it was a lightly defended and perhaps a seasonally occupied site, containing no more than a few grain storage pits and slag pits, the extent of these being the obvious sign of continued occupation.

The Compton area had a sizeable community in the bronze-age and there are many other banks and field systems evident in the surrounding downs.

Today, the earthwork ditches and ramparts are not well defined, whether this was the original design, or more the result of deterioration over time is not clear, since the site is currently farmland and has been heavily ploughed.

Location
The site lies at a level of between 135–145 m AOD. The summit of the (unnamed) hill lies a small distance away to the northwest, at 160 m AOD.

See also 
List of places in Berkshire
List of hill forts in England
List of hill forts in Scotland
List of hill forts in Wales

References

External links 
Perborough Castle at the Digital Hillfort Project



Hill forts in Berkshire
West Berkshire District